The following is a list of the 80 municipalities (comuni) of the Province of Catanzaro, Calabria, Italy.

List

References

Catanzaro